Severe Tropical Cyclone Waka (Fiji Meteorological Service designation: 03F, Joint Typhoon Warning Center designation: 07P) was one of the most destructive tropical cyclones ever to affect the South Pacific Kingdom of Tonga. Waka originated within the near-equatorial trough in mid-December 2001, although the system remained disorganized for more than a week. The storm gradually matured and attained tropical cyclone status on December 29. Shortly thereafter, it passed directly over Vavaʻu, Tonga, resulting in widespread damage. By January 1, 2002, the cyclone began to weaken as it underwent an extratropical transition. The remnants of Waka persisted for several more days and were last observed near the Southern Ocean on January 6, 2002.

Although the storm affected several countries along its path, Waka left the most significant losses in Tonga, where it killed one person and wrought 104.2 million paʻanga ($51.3 million USD) in damage. Hundreds of structures, including 200 in the island's largest city, and much of the nation's agriculture were destroyed. Winds in excess of  battered Vava'u, defoliating nearly every tree on the island. In addition to infrastructural and public losses, the environment was also severely affected; a native species of bat lost roughly 80% of its population due to the lack of fruit. Following the storm, Tonga requested international aid to cope with the scale of damage. Due to the severity of damage, the name Waka was later retired and replaced with Wiki. According to a study by Janet Franklin et al., storms similar in intensity to Waka, on average, strike Tonga once every 33 years.

Meteorological history

In mid-December 2001, at the end of a Madden–Julian oscillation pulse, twin equatorial monsoonal troughs developed in the Northern and Southern Hemispheres. On December 19, the southern component was classified as Tropical Depression 03F by the Fiji Meteorological Service; at this time the depression was situated just east of the Solomon Islands. The northern component eventually developed into Typhoon Faxai, an extremely powerful Category 5 equivalent cyclone. Unlike Faxai, the precursor to Cyclone Waka developed slowly, mainly because of moderate wind shear in the region. Moving southeastward, the system gradually became more organized. On two occasions, the Joint Typhoon Warning Center (JTWC) issued a Tropical Cyclone Formation Alert; however, the agency later canceled them both times. By December 27, the depression had entered a region of lesser shear, favoring significant development of the system.

Tracking towards the southwest in response to a mid-level ridge to the southeast, the depression quickly intensified, attaining gale-force winds on December 29. Upon doing so, it was upgraded to a tropical cyclone and given the name Waka. During December 30, the center of the storm brushed Wallis Island before turning towards the southeast and accelerating due to an approaching trough from the northwest. Later that day, the cyclone attained its peak intensity as a Category 4 severe tropical cyclone with ten-minute sustained winds of 185 km/h (115 km/h) and a barometric pressure of 930 mbar (hPa). The JTWC assessed the storm to have attained similar one-minute sustained winds upon peaking; however, this was due to discrepancies between the two warning centers. Shortly after attaining its peak intensity, the center of Waka passed over Vava'u.

Continuing into the new year, Waka gradually weakened on January 1, 2002, as it entered a less favorable region for tropical cyclones. As a result, wind shear displaced convection from the center and its eyewall broke apart. Moving over decreasing sea surface temperatures, Waka began to undergo an extratropical transition, which it completed on January 2. Tracking southeastward, the remnant cyclone briefly slowed over open waters before again accelerating. Over the following few days, the system gradually weakened, with sustained winds decreasing below gale-force by January 5.

Preparations and impact

Tonga
On December 30, just a day before Waka passed through Tonga, warnings were issued for numerous islands, including parts of Fiji and Samoa. Forecasts showed the storm passing directly over the low-lying Tongan capital of Nuku'alofa as a Category 3 cyclone. Owing to warnings from local media, all New Year's Eve celebrations were canceled as residents and tourists boarded up their homes. All airports in the region were shut down and ferry service was suspended.

In the southern islands, wind gusts up to  affected isolated areas.

Initial reports from Nukuʻalofa on December 31 indicated severe agricultural damage but few infrastructural losses. Following the passage of Waka, communication with Niuas and Vava'u were lost. According to local reports, high winds sandblasted Neiafu and downed nearly every tree. Surveys by the Red Cross revealed that roughly 200 homes in the city were severely damaged or destroyed and those left standing lost their roofs. Vava'u lost roughly 90% of its crops, including essential food crops such as taro, yams and bananas. In Ha'apai, one person died from cardiac arrest brought on by the storm. Fallen trees blocked numerous roads; power and water supplies were also interrupted to most residents. Severe damage also took place on Niuatoputapu where coastal homes were impacted by Waka's storm surge and several structures lost their roofs. In one instance, a yacht was brought onshore by the surge and crashed into a restaurant, destroying both.

According to damage surveys, 13 of the country's islands sustained damage; 470 homes and 6 schools were destroyed and hundreds more damaged. Damage throughout Tonga amounted to 104.2 million paʻanga ($51.3 million USD). In addition to infrastructural and public damage, the environment sustained catastrophic losses on Tonga. The Insular Flying Fox (Pteropus tonganus), a native species of bat, suffered great losses from Waka. Compared to pre-cyclone population levels, 79.8% (±9.9%) of the species was killed across six islands. This was due to widespread destruction of their natural food source, which decreased by 85% (±11.8%) following Waka. Trees across Vava'u were completely defoliated, although only 6.6% were killed, leaving no food for the bats. The greatest decline in bats was on Utula'aina Island at 95.7%; A'a Island sustained a complete loss of food-bearing plants. Six months after the storm, the bat population in Vava'u was still only 20% of the pre-storm level.

Elsewhere
During the cyclone's formative stages, it brought significant winds and swells to Tokelau, resulting in localized flooding and crop damage. The winds downed a few trees and caused minor crop damage, with losses amounting to US$120,000. Large swells affected the island for roughly a week as the storm developed and moved away from the region. Cyclone Waka also affected Wallis and Futuna, prompting tropical cyclone watches and warnings from December 28 to 31, and later impacted Niue, prompting warnings there from December 30 to January 1. On Wallis Island, one home was destroyed and 50% of the banana crop was lost. Numerous fallen trees and power lines blocked roads and left southern areas of the island without power for roughly six hours. Damage in Niue amounted to US$10,000.

Thousands of residents and tourists were in the region following the New Year's holiday. Meteorologists warned that the oceans would be increasingly dangerous and advised people not to venture into the water. Every lifeguard in Whangamatā, as well as former lifeguards, were called in to assist in keeping an estimated 8,000 people out of the water. Although most people stayed within a designated swimming area, several rescues had to be made. Rip currents also pulled 38 people out to sea in Mount Maunganui Main Beach; all were quickly rescued by lifeguards.

Aftermath

Within a day of Cyclone Waka's passage in Tonga, the Government of New Zealand deployed an aircraft to survey the scale of damage and reestablish contact with the Tongan Islands. This aircraft was sent in accordance with the FRANZ Agreement, enacted in 1992, which states that assets from one country would be used in relief operations. On January 2, the head of Tonga's Disaster Office announced that they would likely need international assistance to recover from the storm. Due to the substantial damage to agriculture, food shortages were expected to impact the region over the following months. By January 7, the Red Cross began sending supplies to Tonga. Hundreds of tents and tarpaulins were brought in by an Australian AC-130 to help with the recovery process. On January 12, a New Zealand Lockheed C-130 Hercules carrying US$700,000 worth of supplies flew to the area to deliver aid. An additional US$700,000 was given in relief funds to repair damage wrought by the storm. Of this, US$500,000 would be used to repair schools that were damaged or destroyed and the remaining US$200,000 would be used for emergency lighting, cooking and food supply recovery.

Further funds came from the United States Agency for International Development, which offered US$25,000 by mid-January. The French Polynesian assembly in Tahiti also provided US$770,000 worth of relief supplies and aid. The main industry of Tonga, tourism, was devastated by the storm as no tourists were allowed to travel to the region for at least two weeks after Waka's passage. The Government of Tonga requested a total of US$39.2 million in international aid, most of which was dedicated to rehabilitation of infrastructure. Medical supplies and personnel were later deployed by the World Health Organization. In early March, a relief fund based on donations was set up by the United Methodist Committee on Relief to provide US$210,000 for 30 families impacted by the storm. About 180 people were given assistance in rebuilding their homes by the Church World Service later that month. As food shortages became severe in April, emergency supplies were sent to the outlying Niuas islands of Tonga. In May, US$5.85 million was approved for emergency funds by the World Bank to assist in infrastructural rehabilitation.

Vava'u suffered a tremendous decrease in agricultural exports due to Waka, dropping 86.5% from the previous year. Despite substantial agricultural losses, the sector ended up expanding roughly 2% by the end of 2002 and the overall economy grew by 2.9%. Owing to the severity of damage wrought by the cyclone, the World Meteorological Organization retired the name Waka following its using.

See also

2001–02 South Pacific cyclone season

References
General

Specific

External links

2001–02 South Pacific cyclone season
Category 4 South Pacific cyclones
Tropical cyclones in New Zealand
Tropical cyclones in Tonga
Tropical cyclones in Wallis and Futuna
2001 in Tonga
2002 in Tonga
2001 in Niue
2002 in Niue
2001 in Wallis and Futuna
Retired South Pacific cyclones
Tropical cyclones in Tokelau
Tropical cyclones in American Samoa
Tropical cyclones in Niue
Tropical cyclones in 2001